Nawarupa (also spelt nawa rupa;), also known as byala (Arakanese: ဗျာလ or ဗျာလ္လ), is a chimeric creature found in Burmese and Rakhine (Arakanese) mythology. The beast is made of 9 animals, possessing the trunk of a naga or elephant, the eyes of a deer, the horns of a rhinoceros, the tongue or wings of a parrot, the body of a lion or naya, the tail of a peacock or yak, the ears of an elephant or horse, and the feet of a chinthe or karaweik. In the Konbaung dynasty, the nawarupa decorated one of the ceremonial royal barges.

See also 

 Mythical creatures in Burmese folklore
 List of hybrid creatures in folklore
 Hatsadiling
 Pyinsarupa

References 

Mythological hybrids
Burmese legendary creatures